Guayacanes is a small community located on the San Pedro de Macorís Province of the Dominican Republic.

Populated places in San Pedro de Macorís Province
Municipalities of the Dominican Republic